Giorgi Tsimakuridze (born 10 November 1983, Chkhorotsku) is a professional Georgian football midfielder. Previously played for TOT-CAT as midfielder in Thailand and appeared in Thai premier league all-stars team to play with Atlético Madrid in 2010.

External links 

 Profile on Football Squads
 

1983 births
Living people
Footballers from Georgia (country)
FC Stal Alchevsk players
FC Stal-2 Alchevsk players
FC Shakhtar-2 Donetsk players
FC Mariupol players
FC Zorya Luhansk players
MŠK Žilina players
FC Dinamo Tbilisi players
FC Spartaki Tskhinvali players
Ukrainian Premier League players
Ukrainian First League players
Ukrainian Second League players
Slovak Super Liga players
Expatriate footballers from Georgia (country)
Expatriate footballers in Thailand
Expatriate footballers in Ukraine
Expatriate footballers in Slovakia
Expatriate sportspeople from Georgia (country) in Thailand
Expatriate sportspeople from Georgia (country) in Ukraine
Expatriate sportspeople from Georgia (country) in Slovakia
Association football midfielders
FC Shakhtar Donetsk players
Giorgi Tsimakuridze
Giorgi Tsimakuridze
Giorgi Tsimakuridze
Giorgi Tsimakuridze
Giorgi Tsimakuridze
FC Merani Martvili players